Jagajyothi Basveshwara is a 1959 Indian Kannada-language film directed by T. V. Singh Thakur featuring actors Honnappa Bhagavatar, Rajkumar, K. S. Ashwath, B. Saroja Devi, Narasimharaju, Balakrishna in pivotal roles. The film is based on the life Basaveshwar, a philosopher and social reformer from Karnataka who lived in the 12th century A.D.

Cast
 Honnappa Bhagavatar as Basava/Basavanna
 Rajkumar as King Bijjala
 B. Saroja Devi
 Sandhya
 K. S. Ashwath
 Narasimharaju as Veerabhadra
 Balakrishna
 G. V. Iyer
 H. R. Shastry
 Siddaiah Swamy
 Advani Lakshmi Devi
 Ramaadevi
 Padmini Priyadarshini

Soundtrack

Awards
 National Film Award for Best Feature Film in Kannada

References

External links
 Jagajyothi Basveshwara on Youtube
 Jagajyothi Basaveshwara on Chiloka

1959 films
1950s Kannada-language films
Films set in the 12th century
Films scored by G. K. Venkatesh